Kikonge Hydroelectric Power Station project is a proposed   hydroelectric dam in Ruvuma Region, Tanzania.

Location
The power station and the associated dam and water reservoir would be located in the Kikonge area in the Ruvuma Region in south-western Tanzania.

Overview
As part of the development, a high voltage transmission line, an irrigation scheme, and an agro-business development are also planned. The pre-feasibility study is expected to last 22 months and the power station, if developed, is expected online in 2025.

See also

List of hydropower stations in Africa
List of power stations in Tanzania

References

External links
Tanesco Official Website

Dams in Tanzania
Ruvuma Region
Hydroelectric power stations in Tanzania
Buildings and structures in the Ruvuma Region
Proposed hydroelectric power stations
Proposed renewable energy power stations in Tanzania